École secondaire catholique Garneau (Garneau Catholic High School), is a French-language high school teaching grades 7–12 in the community of Orléans in the eastern end of Ottawa, Ontario (capital of Canada).

History

In 1972 the school was opened and named in honour of the French-Canadian politician, poet, and historian François-Xavier Garneau of the 19th century.

Building and location

In 2001 the construction of l'école élementaire Garneau, a new addition onto l'école secondaire Garneau, was due in part to expanding demographics, the expanded school-closure of the francophone intermediate school, école intermediaire Léo-D-Côté and its transformation into l'École élémentaire catholique Saint-Joseph d'Orléans (703095).  Garneau High School would eventually serve as both a high school and intermediate school, which, according to the Ministry of Education (Ontario), are two distinct schools : École intermédiaire Garneau 7e-8e (752576) and École secondaire catholique Garneau (710903). Both schools are physically located at 6588 Rue Carrière, Ottawa, Ontario, K1C 1J4.

Double cohort
Between the late 1990s and early 2000s high schools in Ontario, including Garneau, were affected by the Ontario Conservative Government's plans to reform secondary schools. A 1997 announcement by the government included plans to reduce Ontario's five-year high school program with a four-year program. In 2003 this created a phenomenon dubbed the double cohort, whereas students from the old program, the five-year Ontario Academic Credit (OAC) or grade thirteen program, and the new four-year program graduated together for the first time.

Over-population
École secondaire catholique Béatrice-Desloges, another Catholic high school in the Ottawa—Orléans region, was constructed in 1997 (25 years after Garneau) and gradually integrated students one grade year at a time. This prevented most students attending Garneau from switching over to the new school. It also helped with a gradual reduction of Garneau's over-population.

Geography
Garneau is located in a highly Francophone area (See map of Ottawa showing the francophone concentrations). The next closest structure and organization, which is 200 meters to the east of Garneau, is the Mouvement d'implication Francophone d'Orléans (MIFO), an organisation that has continuously encouraged Francophone culture within the community of Orléans. Approximately another 900 meters from MIFO is located an Independent grocery store.

In April 2008, according to the City of Ottawa, Garneau was located in the Innes ward, previously known as "Old Ward no. 2".

School boards
Garneau is listed under the Conseil des écoles catholiques du Centre-Est (CECCE). However, according to the Ontario government the official name of Garneau's School board, or more precisely the CECLFCE, is the Conseil scolaire de district catholique du Centre-Est de l'Ontario (CSDCEO). Both school board names, CECLFCE and CSDCEO, correspond to the same physical address.
According to many students of the school, the school board and council often acts in an unjust fashion, especially when dealing with incidents like when a student caused a fire in one of the bathrooms

Parks
Garneau High School has several surrounding parks and fields that are regularly used by students and east-end athletic associations. In 2007 the Orléans Bengals and Gloucester Dukes football clubs had publicly complained about the mosquito infestation within the east-end Ottawa fields, especially the Garneau fields.  Innes Councilor Rainer Bloess jokingly stated in a press conference that he "went up to visit and see if they really had a problem or if they were just being wimps." He also stated that "after being with them [athletic or football associations] for five minutes I beat a hasty retreat back to my van and spoke to them through a little crack in the window... enough to convince me that the location is obviously a prime mosquito location." In June 2007, Councillors Bloess, Rob Jellett and Bob Monette agreed to a year-long pilot program to reduce the amount of mosquito larvae by possibly using biological protein crystals produced by naturally occurring bacteria called Bti.

Programs offered

CCNA Cisco courses and computers
Garneau offers a variety of specialized courses including programming and economics in addition to traditional coursework. Garneau and Cisco Systems have paired together to offer the students of grade 10, 11 and 12 a college-level Cisco CCNA networking course. The Cisco Networking Academy Program lists 114 Secondary Schools and 29 Colleges as participating schools. The School's name is not specifically mentioned on the list, however it is listed under the official school board's name the Conseil scolaire de district catholique du Centre-Est de l'Ontario. The Cisco 3 class was split into Cisco 3 and Cisco 4 classes, adding further depth and time into the program.

Fotek
An in-school IT enterprise started, maintained fully by students.  Teachers, staff, students and parents can have their computers repaired, receive tutorials or other IT services.

Audio engineering
Created circa 2008, the audio engineering (TGR3M) program involves the editing, recording and publication of music and the creation of radio advertisements for the school's station.

An example of such work was located at Garneau's YouTube page. It featured the French folk song "Noël c'est l'amour", created by students and teachers at the school. The main musicians were Élizabeth Chamberland, Sara Nizman and Kelly Raffray. The instruments were either recorded or created using an Oxygen 25 MIDI Controller and HALionOne.  The song was then edited by the school's audio engineering students, mainly using Cubase software.

Graduation

2007
In June 2007 l'École secondaire catholique Garneau, under the direction of Mme Vidosa, publicly congratulated all of its finishing 2006–2007 graduates by publishing their names in a local news paper called l'Express. The convocation took place at l'Église Saint-Joseph-d'Orléans on the June 21, 2007. 35 prizes and bursaries totaling approximately $15000, gathered from within the Orleans community, were awarded to distinguished students. According to the press release, many students received study and admission awards from post secondary institutions.

Notable alumni

Ivanie Blondin - Speed skater who won gold and silver medals in the 2022 Winter Olympics in Beijing

See also
List of high schools in Ontario

Notes and references

External links

Official GuG homepage 
Concentration informatique « Les technologies de l’information et des communications » 
Official site of school 
Official site of school district 
List of French Ontario school 

Educational institutions established in 1972
French-language schools in Ottawa
High schools in Ottawa
Catholic secondary schools in Ontario
French-language high schools in Ontario
1972 establishments in Ontario
Middle schools in Ottawa